Micractinium is a genus of green algae in the family Chlorellaceae.

Taxonomy
The genus Micractinium was formerly placed in the family Micractiniaceae, characterized by sexual reproduction without the production of zoospores, and colonies covered with bristles. Molecular phylogenetic studies showed that Micractiniaceae was polyphyletic and that Micractinium was closely related to Chlorella. Accordingly, Micractinium has been transferred to the family Chlorellaceae.

Species
, AlgaeBase accepted the following species:
Micractinium appendiculatum Korshikov
Micractinium belenophorum (Korshikov) T.Proschold, C.Block, W.Luo & L.Kreinitz
Micractinium bornhemiense (W.Conrad) Korshikov
Micractinium conductrix (K.Brandt) Pröschold & Darienko
Micractinium conococcoides T.Hortobagyi
Micractinium crassisetum Hortobágyi
Micractinium depressum C.-C.Jao & Ling
Micractinium elongatum (H.J.Carter) Hegewald & Schnepf
Micractinium extremum Hortobágyi
Micractinium inermum R.Hoshina & Y.Fujiwara
Micractinium kostikovii E.Krivina & A.Temraleeva
Micractinium parvisetum Walton
Micractinium parvum Hindák
Micractinium pusillum Fresenius
Micractinium quadrisetum (Lemmermann) G.M.Smith
Micractinium simplicissimum H.Chae, H.-G. Choi & J.H.Kim
Micractinium singularis H.Chae, H.-G.Choi & J.H.Kim
Micractinium strigoniense T.Hortobagyi
Micractinium tetrahymenae Pröschold, Pitsch & Darienko
Micractinium valkanovii Vodenicarov
Micractinium variabile H.Chae, H.-G.Choi & J.H.Kim

References

Trebouxiophyceae genera
Chlorellaceae